The 1981 Bowling Green Falcons football team was an American football team that represented Bowling Green University in the Mid-American Conference (MAC) during the 1981 NCAA Division I-A football season. In their fifth season under head coach Denny Stolz, the Falcons compiled a 5–5–1 record (5–3–1 against MAC opponents), finished in fourth place in the MAC, and outscored their opponents by a combined total of 155 to 132.

The team's statistical leaders included Dayne Palsgrove with 732 passing yards, Bryant Jones with 1,051 rushing yards, and Shawn Potts with 391 receiving yards.

Schedule

References

Bowling Green
Bowling Green Falcons football seasons
Bowling Green Falcons football